The chapters of the Japanese shōjo manga series  are written by Miyuki Kobayashi and illustrated by Natsumi Andō and have been serialized in the monthly manga magazine Nakayoshi by Kodansha from 2004 to 2008. The story is about protagonist Najika Kazami, an orphan from Hokkaidō with a talent for cooking, transfers to Seika Academy to chase her dream of being a great chef, and to find her "Flan Prince", a boy that saved her from falling into a river and gave her a cup of flan with a silver spoon with the school's emblem on it. It won the Kodansha Manga Award for children's manga in 2006.

The manga series includes 47 chapters which are collected in tankōbon and are released by Kodansha. The first volume of Kitchen Princess was released on February 4, 2005  and last was released on  November 6, 2008. The series has also been released in English Del Rey Manga in the USA.



Volume list

References 

Kitchen Princess